Jean Benner (28 March 1836, in Mulhouse – 28 October 1906, in Paris) was a French artist, and twin to fellow artist, Emmanuel Benner.

Early life

Twins Jean and Emmanuel Benner were born in March 1836 in Mulhouse, Alsace, France to Jean Benner-Fries.

Career
The Benner brothers were first designers at Mulhouse mills and factories. By 30 years of age, Jean was able to study art with Léon Bonnat, Eck and Jean-Jacques Henner and exhibited at the Paris Salon in 1868. In 1881 he won his first medal there for this painting Le Repos.

He painted still-life, portrait and genre paintings, including After a Storm at Capri (1872), Trappist in Prayer (1875), Petite Falle de Capri, Flowers and Fruits (1868), and Reverie.

He also painted in the Isle of Capri, which was an artist colony at that time, its residents included Frederic Leighton, Walter McLaren, John Singer Sargent, Edouard Alexandre Sain, and Sophie Gengembre Anderson.

Works
A house in Capri, 1881, Fine Arts Museum, Pau
Briseis weeping over the body of Patroclus, 1878, château-musée, Nemours 
Ecstasy, Strasbourg Museum of Modern and Contemporary Art
Girl in Capri, 1906, Fine Arts Museum of Nantes
Hollyhocks, Musée d'art et d'archéologie, Senlis
Les Pêcheurs, Musée d'art moderne André Malraux, Le Havre
Portrait of Jean-Jacques Henner, 1899, Fine Arts Museum, Mulhouse
Portrait of Emmanuel Benner, Fine Arts Museum of Nantes
Salomé, Fine Arts Museum of Nantes
To France, always, Fine Arts Museum, Mulhouse

Gallery

References

19th-century French painters
French male painters
French portrait painters
French landscape painters
French genre painters
French designers
1836 births
1909 deaths
Artists from Mulhouse
Burials at Père Lachaise Cemetery
Painters from Alsace
French twins
19th-century French male artists